Lynden-Bell may refer to:

People
Arthur Lynden-Bell (1867–1943), British Army officer
Donald Lynden-Bell (1935–2018), British astrophysicist
Ruth Lynden-Bell (born 1937), British chemist

Others
18235 Lynden-Bell, main-belt asteroid, named after Donald Lynden-Bell